The 1978 European Formula Three Championship was the fourth FIA European Formula 3 Championship season, contested over 16 rounds.

Jan Lammers of the Netherlands won the drivers championship with 72 points. Points were awarded in 9-6-4-3-2-1 fashion to the first six finishers. The four worst results were discarded.

Schedule

Results

Season standings

Drivers standings

For every race 9 points were awarded to the winner, 6 to the runner up, 4 for third place, 3 for fourth place, 2 for fifth place and 1 for sixth place. No additional points were awarded.

Four scores were dropped. Dropped scores are shown in parentheses.

Although Jan Lammers and Anders Olofsson tied on points and tied on four wins each, Lammers took the championship by virtue of scoring five second places to Olofsson's three.

References
Points table

Formula Three
FIA European Formula 3 Championship